USS Robert G. Bradley (FFG-49) is an Oliver Hazard Perry-class frigate, a decommissioned ship of the United States Navy named for Lieutenant Robert G. Bradley (1921–1944), who was awarded the Navy Cross posthumously for his heroism on  during the Battle of Leyte Gulf.

Robert G. Bradley'''s keel was laid down by Bath Iron Works Corp., Bath, Maine, on 28 December 1982.
She was launched 13 August 1983, sponsored by Mrs. Edna D. Woodruff, mother of Lt. Bradley; commissioned 30 June 1984. Ship was homeported in Mayport, Florida. She was decommissioned in Mayport on 28 March 2014.

Namesake

Robert Graham Bradley was born in Washington, D.C., on 26 September 1921. He was appointed to the United States Naval Academy on 9 June 1939, and graduated on 19 June 1942. He completed instruction at the Atlantic Subordinate Command, Service Force, Norfolk, Va. (3 July – 27 October 1942), and on 29 October reported to New York Shipbuilding Corporation, Camden, New Jersey, for the fitting out of small aircraft carrier . He served as a member of the ship's company when Princeton was commissioned on 25 February 1943, and while on board received promotions to lieutenant, junior grade and lieutenant (1 May 1943 and 1 July 1944, respectively), as she took part in operations ranging from the occupation of Baker Island (September 1943) to the Battle of Leyte Gulf (October 1944).

On 24 October 1944 while Princeton steamed with Task Group 38.3 (part of Task Force 38) in Leyte Gulf off the east coast of Luzon, Philippines, a Japanese plane, tentatively identified as a Yokosuka D4Y1 Type 2 [Judy], attacked the ship. Its bomb penetrated the flight, hangar, and main decks and exploded, igniting an inferno that swept across the hangar deck. Explosions rocked the carrier, but Bradley, the ship's assistant first lieutenant, led a repair party and battled the blaze on the second and third decks. Their success in fighting the fire led many of the men to believe that if they could clear the smoke from Princeton's largely undamaged machinery spaces, they could raise steam and save the ship. At 13:00 Bradley returned to Princeton from Morrison — which lay alongside Princeton's starboard quarter to play her hoses onto the flames and became temporarily wedged between two of the carrier's overhanging stacks. The determined firefighting efforts had nearly controlled the fire, but it raged again during the ensuing lull. Following the alert, Birmingham and Morrison closed and attempted to secure a line to Princeton. At 15:15 the cruiser succeeded on its third try, but at 15:23 the flames touched off four hundred 100-pound bombs stowed aft in the torpedo magazine. The resulting explosion blew off the upper part of the carrier's stern, killing Bradley and every man in the vicinity.

Bradley had repeatedly risked his life, entering the most dangerous areas below deck to ascertain the extent of the damage and to fight the fires blazing on board. For his "outstanding fortitude, great personal valor, and self-sacrificing devotion to the completion of an extremely perilous task," as well as his "extraordinary heroism," Bradley received the Navy Cross posthumously. Bradley's name appears on the Tablets of the Missing, Manila American Cemetery, Manila, Philippines.

 Service history Robert G. Bradley was laid down on 28 December 1982 at Bath, Maine, by Bath Iron Works Corp. and launched on 13 August 1983; sponsored by Mrs. Edna D. Woodruff, Bradley's mother; and commissioned on 30 June 1984, Commander. Thomas I. Eubanks in command.Robert G. Bradley deployed to the Mediterranean (18 August 1986 – 7 March 1987; 4 November 1994 – 15 April 1995; and 28 June–21 December 1996); the Mediterranean and North Atlantic (5 January–2 July 1998); and the Middle East Force (Horn of Africa, Persian Gulf, 28 April–28 October 1988). In addition, she made multiple law enforcement and counter-narcotics deployments to the Caribbean and eastern Pacific, and carried out a number of specialized operations in North American, Latin American, and European waters. The ship also took part in Operation Support Democracy: a UN attempt to restore order in Haiti (September–October 1993). Robert G. Bradley operated off Haiti's northern coast, tracking an average of more than 150 ships per day. During the ship's deployments, she normally embarked one or two Sikorsky SH-60B Seahawks of Helicopter Antisubmarine Squadrons (Light) (HSL) 42, 46, or 48.
 Robert G. Bradley intercepted fishing vessel Recuerdo, smuggling  of cocaine, in the eastern Pacific (3 August 2001). She subsequently turned over the suspects and their illicit cargo to U.S. and Panamanian law enforcement authorities. Robert G. Bradley then intercepted a go fast carrying  of cocaine (3 September). The ship sank the go fast, and turned over the narcotics and the four smugglers to coastal patrol ship , which transferred them to U.S. law enforcement authorities. In company with destroyer , Robert G. Bradley monitored and boarded fishing vessel Lilliana 1, took the boat under tow when she developed engine trouble, and brought her 13 crewmembers ashore (24 September–5 October).Robert G. Bradleys (2 June–2 September 2003) counter-narcotics deployment to the Caribbean and eastern Pacific proved especially eventful. The ship operated as the on-scene commander for the search and rescue of fishing vessel Fufu Chen and her nine crewmembers off the Costa Rican coast (17–19 July). Fishing boat Costa del Sol transferred three survivors for treatment to Robert G. Bradley, and fishing vessel Arelis transferred a fourth person. The ship then shifted the survivors to the Costa Rican Coast Guard. Guided missile frigate  transferred 19 narcotics smugglers she had apprehended to Robert G. Bradley in Panamanian waters, which then turned them over to the U.S. Drug Enforcement Administration (8–13 August).
 
The ship next intercepted and boarded fishing vessel Llanero, which flew the Nicaraguan flag without proper documentation (26–27 August). Her boarding team discovered  of cocaine hidden in the hold, and apprehended eight smugglers. The inspectors determined that Llanero was unfit for the sea and sank her with GAU-16 fire from Cutlass 472, her embarked Seahawk, and 76 and 25 millimeter gunfire, 40 millimeter grenades, and .50 caliber fire from the ship. Robert G. Bradley and a U.S. Coast Guard Lockheed HC-130H "Hercules" chased a go fast that escaped into Colombian waters and beached herself on the Island de Providencia (30 August). The smugglers fled, but Colombian Coast Guardsmen recovered  of cocaine.Robert G. Bradley'' is set to be transferred to the Bahrain Navy in 2019 for US$150m including refurbishment, spares, support and training.

References

External links 
 

 navysite.de: USS Robert G. Bradley
MaritimeQuest USS Robert G. Bradley FFG-49 pages

 

1983 ships
Oliver Hazard Perry-class frigates of the United States Navy
Ships built in Bath, Maine